Lancrans is a former commune in the Ain department in the Auvergne-Rhône-Alpes region in Eastern France. In 2017, it had a population of 1,054. On 1 January 2019, it was merged into the new commune of Valserhône. In 1858, Vanchy (renamed Coupy in 1907, merged in 1966 into Bellegarde-sur-Valserine) and Confort separated from Lancrans to form new communes.

Geography
The town of Lancrans is located to the northeast of the Pertes de la Valserine, a small canyon where the Valserine runs partly underground. It used to mark the border with Bellegarde-sur-Valserine. It is similar to the former Perte du Rhône.

Population

See also
Communes of the Ain department

References

Former communes of Ain
Ain communes articles needing translation from French Wikipedia
Populated places disestablished in 2019